is a 1929 black and white Japanese silent film with benshi accompaniment directed by Torajiro Saito. A melodrama about an orphan and her mother who are separated and lose contact, but are later reunited.

Cast
 Mitsuko Takao
 Reikichi Kawamura
 Yoshiko Kawada
 Shoichi Kotoda
 Shin Kuragata

External links
 
 

1929 films
Films about orphans
Shochiku films
Japanese silent films
Japanese black-and-white films
Japanese drama films
1929 drama films
Melodrama films
Silent drama films